A month is a unit of time, used with calendars, that is approximately as long as a natural orbital period of the Moon; the words month and Moon are cognates. The traditional concept arose with the cycle of Moon phases; such lunar months ("lunations") are synodic months and last approximately 29.53 days. From excavated tally sticks, researchers have deduced that people counted days in relation to the Moon's phases as early as the Paleolithic age. Synodic months, based on the Moon's orbital period with respect to the Earth–Sun line, are still the basis of many calendars today, and are used to divide the year.

Types of months in astronomy 

The following types of months are mainly of significance in astronomy, most of them (but not the distinction between sidereal and tropical months) first recognized in Babylonian lunar astronomy.

 The sidereal month is defined as the Moon's orbital period in a non-rotating frame of reference (which on average is equal to its rotation period in the same frame). It is about 27.32166 days (27 days, 7 hours, 43 minutes, 11.6 seconds). It is closely equal to the time it takes the Moon to twice pass a "fixed" star (different stars give different results because all have a very small proper motion and are not really fixed in position).
 A synodic month is the most familiar lunar cycle, defined as the time interval between two consecutive occurrences of a particular phase (such as new moon or full moon) as seen by an observer on Earth. The mean length of the synodic month is 29.53059 days (29 days, 12 hours, 44 minutes, 2.8 seconds). Due to the eccentricity of the lunar orbit around Earth (and to a lesser degree, the Earth's elliptical orbit around the Sun), the length of a synodic month can vary by up to seven hours.
 The tropical month is the average time for the Moon to pass twice through the same equinox point of the sky. It is 27.32158 days, very slightly shorter than the sidereal month (27.32166) days, because of precession of the equinoxes.
 An anomalistic month is the average time the Moon takes to go from perigee to perigee—the point in the Moon's orbit when it is closest to Earth. An anomalistic month is about 27.55455 days on average.
 The draconic month, draconitic month, or nodal month is the period in which the Moon returns to the same node of its orbit; the nodes are the two points where the Moon's orbit crosses the plane of the Earth's orbit. Its duration is about 27.21222 days on average.

A synodic month is longer than a sidereal month because the Earth-Moon system is orbiting the Sun in the same direction as the Moon is orbiting the Earth. The Sun moves eastward with respect to the stars (as does the Moon) and it takes about 2.2 days longer for the Moon to return to the same apparent position with respect to the Sun.

An anomalistic month is longer than a sidereal month because the perigee moves in the same direction as the Moon is orbiting the Earth, one revolution in nine years. Therefore, the Moon takes a little longer to return to perigee than to return to the same star.

A draconic month is shorter than a sidereal month because the nodes move in the opposite direction as the Moon is orbiting the Earth, one revolution in 18.6 years. Therefore, the Moon returns to the same node slightly earlier than it returns to the same star.

Calendrical consequences 

At the simplest level, most well-known lunar calendars are based on the initial approximation that 2 lunations last 59 solar days: a 30-day full month followed by a 29-day hollow month — but this is only roughly accurate and regularly needs intercalation (correction) by a leap day.

Additionally, the synodic month does not fit easily into the solar (or 'tropical') year, which makes accurate, rule-based lunisolar calendars that combine the two cycles complicated. The most common solution to this problem is the Metonic cycle, which takes advantage of the fact that 235 lunations are approximately 19 tropical years (which add up to not quite 6,940 days): 12 years have 12 lunar months, and 7 years are 13 lunar months long. However, a Metonic calendar based year will drift against the seasons by about one day every 2 centuries. Metonic calendars include the calendar used in the Antikythera Mechanism about 21 centuries ago, and the Hebrew calendar.

Alternatively in a pure lunar calendar, years are defined as having always 12 lunations, so a year is 354 or 355 days long: the Islamic calendar is the prime example.  Consequently, an Islamic year is about 11 days shorter than a solar year and cycles through the seasons in about 33 solar = 34 lunar years: the Islamic New Year has a different Gregorian calendar date in each (solar) year.

Purely solar calendars often have months which no longer relate to the phase of the Moon, but are based only on the motion of the Sun relative to the equinoxes and solstices, or are purely conventional like in the widely used Gregorian calendar.

The complexity required in an accurate lunisolar calendar may explain why solar calendars have generally replaced lunisolar and lunar calendars for civil use in most societies.

Months in various calendars

Beginning of the lunar month 
The Hellenic calendars, the Hebrew Lunisolar calendar and the Islamic Lunar calendar started the month with the first appearance of the thin crescent of the new moon.

However, the motion of the Moon in its orbit is very complicated and its period is not constant. The date and time of this actual observation depends on the exact geographical longitude as well as latitude, atmospheric conditions, the visual acuity of the observers, etc. Therefore, the beginning and lengths of months defined by observation cannot be accurately predicted.

While some like orthodox Islam and the Jewish Karaites still rely on actual moon observations, reliance on astronomical calculations and tabular methods is increasingly common in practice.

Roman calendar 
Roman calendar was reformed several times, the last three enduring reforms during historical times. The last three reformed Roman calendars are called the Julian, Augustan, and Gregorian; all had the same number of days in their months. Despite other attempts, the names of the months after the Augustan calendar reform have persisted, and the number of days in each month (except February) have remained constant since before the Julian reform. The Gregorian calendar, like the Roman calendars before it, has twelve months, whose Anglicized names are:
 
{| class="wikitable sortable"
|- style="vertical-align:bottom;"
! Order !! Name !! Numberof days 
|-  style="text-align:center;"
|  1 
|style="text-align:left;"| January || 31 
|-  style="text-align:center;"
|  2 
|style="text-align:left;"| February
| 28
|-  style="text-align:center;"
|  3 
|style="text-align:left;"| March || 31
|-  style="text-align:center;"
|  4 
|style="text-align:left;"| April || 30
|-  style="text-align:center;"
|  5 
|style="text-align:left;"| May || 31
|-  style="text-align:center;"
|  6 
|style="text-align:left;"| June || 30
|- a style="text-align:center;"
|  7 
|style="text-align:left;"| July
| 31
|-  style="text-align:center;"
|  8 
|style="text-align:left;"| August
| 31
|-  style="text-align:center;"
|  9 
|style="text-align:left;"| September || 30 
|-  style="text-align:center;"
| 10 
|style="text-align:left;"| October || 31
|-  style="text-align:center;"
| 11 
|style="text-align:left;"| November || 30
|-  style="text-align:center;"
| 12 
|style="text-align:left;"| December || 31
|}

The famous mnemonic Thirty days hath September is a common way of teaching the lengths of the months in the English-speaking world. The knuckles of the four fingers of one's hand and the spaces between them can be used to remember the lengths of the months. By making a fist, each month will be listed as one proceeds across the hand. All months landing on a knuckle are 31 days long and those landing between them are 30 days long, with variable February being the remembered exception. When the knuckle of the index finger is reached (July), go over to the first knuckle on the other fist, held next to the first (or go back to the first knuckle) and continue with August. This physical mnemonic has been taught to primary school students for many decades, if not centuries.

This cyclical pattern of month lengths matches the musical keyboard alternation of wide white keys (31 days) and narrow black keys (30 days). The note F corresponds to January, the note F corresponds to February, the exceptional 28–29 day month, and so on.

Numerical relations 
The mean month-length in the Gregorian calendar is 30.436875 days.

Any five consecutive months, that do not include February, contain 153 days.

Calends, nones, and ides 
Months in the pre-Julian Roman calendar included:
 Intercalaris an intercalary month occasionally embedded into February, to realign the calendar.
 Quintilis, later renamed to Julius in honour of Julius Caesar.
 Sextilis, later renamed to Augustus in honour of Augustus.

The Romans divided their months into three parts, which they called the calends, the nones, and the ides. Their system is somewhat intricate. 
The ides occur on the thirteenth day in eight of the months, but in March, May, July, and October, they occur on the fifteenth. The nones always occur 8 days (one Roman ‘week’) before the ides, i.e., on the fifth or the seventh. The calends are always the first day of the month, and before Julius Caesar's reform fell sixteen days (two Roman weeks) after the ides (except the ides of February and the intercalary month).

Relations between dates, weekdays, and months in the Gregorian calendar 
Within a month, the following dates fall on the same day of the week:

 01, 08, 15, 22, and 29 (e.g., in January 2022, all these dates fell on a Saturday)
 02, 09, 16, 23, and 30 (e.g., in January 2022, all these dates fell on a Sunday)
 03, 10, 17, 24, and 31 (e.g., in January 2022, all these dates fell on a Monday)
 04, 11, 18, and 25 (e.g., in January 2022, all these dates fell on a Tuesday)
 05, 12, 19, and 26 (e.g., in January 2022, all these dates fell on a Wednesday)
 06, 13, 20, and 27 (e.g., in January 2022, all these dates fell on a Thursday)
 07, 14, 21, and 28 (e.g., in January 2022, all these dates fell on a Friday)

Some months have the same date/weekday structure.

In a non-leap year:

 January/October (e.g., in 2022, they begin on a Saturday)
 February/March/November (e.g., in 2022, they begin on a Tuesday)
 April/July (e.g., in 2022, they began on a Friday) 
 September/December (e.g., in 2022, they will begin on a Wednesday)
  January 1 and December 31 fall on the same weekday (e.g. in 2022 on a Saturday)

In a leap year:

 February/August (e.g. in 2020, they began on a Saturday)
 March/November (e.g., in 2020, they began on a Sunday)
 January/April/July (e.g., in 2020, they began on a Wednesday)
 September/December (e.g., in 2020, they began on a Tuesday)
 February 29 (the leap day) falls on the same weekday like February 1, 08, 15, 22, and August 1 (see above; e.g. in 2020 on a Saturday)

Hebrew calendar 
The Hebrew calendar has 12 or 13 months.
 Nisan, 30 days ניסן
 Iyar, 30 days אייר
 Sivan, 30 days סיון
 Tammuz, 29 days תמוז
 Av, 30 days אב
 Elul, 29 days אלול
 Tishri, 30 days תשרי
 Marcheshvan, 29/30 days מַרְחֶשְׁוָן
 Kislev, 30/29 days כסלו
 Tevet, 29 days טבת
 Shevat, 30 days שבט
 Adar 1, 30 days, intercalary month אדר א
 Adar 2, 29 days אדר ב

Adar 1 is only added 7 times in 19 years. In ordinary years, Adar 2 is simply called Adar.

Islamic calendar 
There are also twelve months in the Islamic calendar. They are named as follows:
 Muharram (Restricted/sacred) محرّم
 Safar (Empty/Yellow) صفر
 Rabī' al-Awwal/Rabi' I (First Spring) ربيع الأول
 Rabī' ath-Thānī/Rabi' al-Aakhir/Rabi' II (Second spring or Last spring) ربيع الآخر أو ربيع الثاني
 Jumada al-Awwal/Jumaada I (First Freeze) جمادى الأول
 Jumada ath-Thānī or Jumādā al-Thānī/Jumādā II (Second Freeze or Last Freeze) جمادى الآخر أو جمادى الثاني
 Rajab (To Respect) رجب
 Sha'bān (To Spread and Distribute) شعبان
 Ramadān (Parched Thirst) رمضان
 Shawwāl (To Be Light and Vigorous) شوّال
 Dhu al-Qi'dah (The Master of Truce) ذو القعدة
 Dhu al-Hijjah (The Possessor of Hajj) ذو الحجة

See Islamic calendar for more information on the Islamic calendar.

Arabic calendar

Hindu calendar 
The Hindu calendar has various systems of naming the months. The months in the lunar calendar are:

These are also the names used in the Indian national calendar for the newly redefined months. Purushottam Maas or Adhik Maas (translit.  = 'extra',  = 'month') is an extra month in the Hindu calendar that is inserted to keep the lunar and solar calendars aligned. "Purushottam" is an epithet of Vishnu, to whom the month is dedicated.

The names in the solar calendar are just the names of the zodiac sign in which the sun travels. They are

 Mesha
 Vrishabha
 Mithuna
 Kataka
 Simha
 Kanyaa
 Tulaa
 Vrishcika
 Dhanus
 Makara
 Kumbha
 Miina

Baháʼí calendar 

The Baháʼí calendar is the calendar used by the Baháʼí Faith. It is a solar calendar with regular years of 365 days, and leap years of 366 days. Years are composed of 19 months of 19 days each (361 days), plus an extra period of "Intercalary Days" (4 in regular and 5 in leap years). The months are named after the attributes of God. Days of the year begin and end at sundown.

Iranian calendar (Persian calendar) 
The Iranian / Persian calendar, currently used in Iran and Afghanistan, also has 12 months. The Persian names are included in the parentheses. It begins on the northern Spring equinox.
 Farvardin (31 days, فروردین)
 Ordibehesht (31 days, اردیبهشت)
 Khordad (31 days, خرداد)
 Tir (31 days, تیر)
 Mordad (31 days, مرداد)
 Shahrivar (31 days, شهریور)
 Mehr (30 days, مهر)
 Aban (30 days, آبان)
 Azar (30 days, آذر)
 Dey (30 days, دی)
 Bahman (30 days, بهمن)
 Esfand (29 days- 30 days in leap year, اسفند)

Reformed Bengali calendar 
The Bangla calendar, used in Bangladesh, follows solar months and it has six seasons. The months and seasons in the calendar are:

Nanakshahi calendar 

The months in the Nanakshahi calendar are:

Khmer calendar 
Different from the Hindu calendar, the Khmer calendar consists of both a lunar calendar and a solar calendar. The solar is used more commonly than the lunar calendar.

The Khmer lunar calendar most often contains 12 months; however, the eighth month is repeated (as a "leap month") every two or three years, making 13 months instead of 12. Each lunar month has 29 or 30 days. The year normally has then 354 or 384 days (when an intercalary month is added), but the calendar follows the rules of the Gregorian calendar to determine leap years and add a lead day to one month, so the Khmer lunar year may have a total of 354, 355, 384 or 385 days.

Thai calendar

Tongan calendar
The Tongan calendar is based on the cycles of the moon around the earth in one year. The months are:

 Liha Mu'a
 Liha Mui
 Vai Mu'a
 Vai Mui
 Faka'afu Mo'ui
 Faka'afu Mate
 Hilinga Kelekele
 Hilinga Mea'a
 'Ao'ao
 Fu'ufu'unekinanga
 'Uluenga
 Tanumanga
 'O'oamofanongo

Pingelapese 
Pingelapese, a language from Micronesia, also uses a lunar calendar. There are 12 months associated with their calendar. The moon first appears in March, they name this month Kahlek. This system has been used for hundreds of years and throughout many generations. This calendar is cyclical and relies on the position and shape of the moon.

Kollam era (Malayalam) calendar

Sinhalese calendar 
The Sinhalese calendar is the Buddhist calendar in Sri Lanka with Sinhala names. Each full moon Poya day marks the start of a Buddhist lunar month. The first month is Bak. 

 Duruthu (දුරුතු)
 Navam (නවම්)
 Mædin (මැදින්)
 Bak (බක්)
 Vesak (වෙසක්)
 Poson (පොසොන්)
 Æsala (ඇසල)
 Nikini (නිකිණි)
 Binara (බිනර)
 Vap (වප්)
 Il (iL) (ඉල්)
 Unduvap (උඳුවප්)

Germanic calendar 

The old Icelandic calendar is not in official use anymore, but some Icelandic holidays and annual feasts are still calculated from it. It has 12 months, broken down into two groups of six often termed "winter months" and "summer months". The calendar is peculiar in that the months always start on the same weekday rather than on the same date. Hence Þorri always starts on a Friday sometime between January 22 and January 28 (Old style: January 9 to January 15), Góa always starts on a Sunday between February 21 and February 27 (Old style: February 8 to February 14).
 Skammdegi ("Short days")
 Gormánuður (mid-October – mid-November, "slaughter month" or "Gór's month")
 Ýlir (mid-November – mid-December, "Yule month")
 Mörsugur (mid-December – mid-January, "fat sucking month")
 Þorri (mid-January – mid-February, "frozen snow month")
 Góa (mid-February – mid-March, "Góa's month, see Nór")
 Einmánuður (mid-March – mid-April, "lone" or "single month")

 Náttleysi ("Nightless days")
 Harpa (mid-April – mid-May, Harpa is a female name, probably a forgotten goddess, first day of Harpa is celebrated as Sumardagurinn fyrsti – first day of summer)
 Skerpla (mid-May – mid-June, another forgotten goddess)
 Sólmánuður (mid-June – mid-July, "sun month")
 Heyannir (mid-July – mid-August, "hay business month")
 Tvímánuður (mid-August – mid-September, "two" or "second month")
 Haustmánuður (mid-September – mid-October, "autumn month")

Old Georgian calendar 

*NOTE: New Year in ancient Georgia started from September.

Old Swedish calendar 
 Torsmånad (January, 'Torre's month' (ancient god))
 Göjemånad (February, 'Goe's month' (ancient goddess))
 Vårmånad (March, 'Spring month')
 Gräsmånad (April, 'Grass month')
 Blomstermånad (May, 'Bloom month')
 Sommarmånad (June, 'Summer month')
 Hömånad (July, 'Hay month')
 Skördemånad, Rötmånad (August, 'Harvest month' or 'Rot month')
 Höstmånad (September, 'Autumn month')
 Slaktmånad (October, 'Slaughter month')
 Vintermånad (November, 'Winter month')
 Julmånad (December, 'Christmas month')

Old English calendar 
Like the Old Norse calendar, the Anglo-Saxons had their own calendar before they were Christianized which reflected native traditions and deities. These months were attested by Bede in his works On Chronology and The Reckoning of Time written in the 8th century. His Old English month names are probably written as pronounced in Bede’s native Northumbrian dialect. The months were named after the moon; the new moon marking the end of an old month and start of a new month; the full moon occurring in the middle of the month, after which the whole month took its name.
{|
|+ from Bede’s The Reckoning of Time
|- style="vertical-align:bottom;text-align:left;"
!style="text-align:center;"| Year  Order   
! NorthumbrianOld English  
! Modern Englishtransliteration 
! Romanequivalent
|- style="vertical-align:top;"
|style="text-align:center;"|  1 
| Æfterra-ġēola mōnaþ     || “After-Yule month”
| January
|- style="vertical-align:top;"
|style="text-align:center;"|  2 
| Sol-mōnaþ || “Sol month”
| February
|- style="vertical-align:top;"
|style="text-align:center;"|  3 
| Hrēð-mōnaþ || “Hreth month”
| March
|- style="vertical-align:top;"
|style="text-align:center;"|  4 
| Ēostur-mōnaþ || “Ēostur month” 
| April
|- style="vertical-align:top;"
|style="text-align:center;"|  5 
| Ðrimilce-mōnaþ || “Three-milkings month”    
| May
|- style="vertical-align:top;"
|style="text-align:center;"|  6 
| Ærra-Liþa || “Ere-Litha” 
| June
|- style="vertical-align:top;"
|style="text-align:center;"|  7 
| Æftera-Liþa || “After-Litha” 
| July
|- style="vertical-align:top;"
|style="text-align:center;"|  8 
| Weōd-mōnaþ || “Weed month” 
| August
|- style="vertical-align:top;"
|style="text-align:center;"|  9 
| Hāliġ-mōnaþ Hærfest-mōnaþ 
| “Holy month”  “Harvest month” 
| September
|- style="vertical-align:top;"
|style="text-align:center;"| 10 
| Winter-fylleþ || “Winter-filleth” 
| October
|- style="vertical-align:top;"
|style="text-align:center;"| 11 
| Blōt-mōnaþ || “Blót month” 
| November
|- style="vertical-align:top;"
|style="text-align:center;"| 12 
| Ærra-ġēola mōnaþ || “Ere-Yule” 
| December
|}

When an intercalary month was needed, a third Litha month was inserted in mid-summer.

Old Hungarian calendar 
Nagyszombati kalendárium (in Latin: Calendarium Tyrnaviense) from 1579.
Historically Hungary used a 12-month calendar that appears to have been zodiacal in nature but eventually came to correspond to the Gregorian months as shown below:
 Boldogasszony hava (January, 'month of the happy/blessed lady')
 Böjtelő hava (February, 'month of early fasting/Lent' or 'month before fasting/Lent')
 Böjtmás hava (March, 'second month of fasting/Lent')
 Szent György hava (April, 'Saint George's month')
 Pünkösd hava (May, 'Pentecost month')
 Szent Iván hava (June, 'Saint John [the Baptist]'s month')
 Szent Jakab hava (July, 'Saint James' month')
 Kisasszony hava (August, 'month of the Virgin')
 Szent Mihály hava (September, 'Saint Michael's month')
 Mindszent hava (October, 'all saints' month')
 Szent András hava (November, 'Saint Andrew's month')
 Karácsony hava (December, 'month of Yule/Christmas')

Czech calendar 

 Leden – derives from 'led' (ice)
 Únor – derives from 'nořit' (to dive, referring to the ice sinking into the water due to melting)
 Březen – derives from 'bříza' (birch)
 Duben – derives from 'dub' (oak)
 Květen – derives from 'květ' (flower)
 Červen – derives from 'červená' (red – for the color of apples and tomatoes)
 Červenec – is the second 'červen' (formerly known as 2nd červen)
 Srpen – derives from old Czech word 'sirpsti' (meaning to reflect, referring to the shine on the wheat)
 Září – means 'to shine'
 Říjen – derives from 'jelení říje', which refers to the estrous cycle of female elk
 Listopad – falling leaves
 Prosinec – derives from old Czech 'prosiněti', which means to shine through (refers to the sun light shining through the clouds)

Old Egyptian calendar 

The ancient civil Egyptian calendar had a year that was 365 days long and was divided into 12 months of 30 days each, plus 5 extra days (epagomenes) at the end of the year. The months were divided into 3 "weeks" of ten days each. Because the ancient Egyptian year was almost a quarter of a day shorter than the solar year and stellar events "wandered" through the calendar, it is referred to as Annus Vagus or "Wandering Year".

Thout
Paopi
Hathor
Koiak
Tooba
Emshir
Paremhat
Paremoude
Pashons
Paoni
Epip
Mesori

Nisga'a calendar 
The Nisga'a calendar coincides with the Gregorian calendar with each month referring to the type of harvesting that is done during the month.
K'aliiyee = Going North – referring to the Sun returning to its usual place in the sky
Buxwlaks = Needles Blowing About – February is usually a very windy month in the Nass River Valley
Xsaak = To Eat Oolichans – Oolichans are harvested during this month
Mmaal = Canoes – The river has defrosted, hence canoes are used once more
Yansa'alt = Leaves are Blooming – Warm weather has arrived and leaves on the trees begin to bloom
Miso'o = Sockeye – majority of Sockeye Salmon runs begin this month
Maa'y = Berries – berry picking season
Wii Hoon = Great Salmon – referring to the abundance of Salmon that are now running
Genuugwwikw = Trail of the Marmot – Marmots, Ermines and animals as such are hunted
Xlaaxw = To Eat Trout – trout are mostly eaten this time of year
Gwilatkw = To Blanket – The earth is "blanketed" with snow
Luut'aa = Sit In – the Sun "sits" in one spot for a period of time

French Republican calendar 

This calendar was proposed during the French Revolution, and used by the French government for about twelve years from late 1793. There were twelve months of 30 days each, grouped into three ten-day weeks called décades. The five or six extra days needed to approximate the tropical year were placed after the months at the end of each year. A period of four years ending on a leap day was to be called a Franciade. It began at the autumn equinox:
 Autumn:
Vendémiaire
Brumaire
Frimaire
 Winter:
Nivôse
Pluviôse
Ventôse
 Spring:
Germinal
Floréal
Prairial
 Summer:
Messidor
Thermidor
Fructidor

Eastern Ojibwe calendar 
Ojibwe month names are based on the key feature of the month. Consequently, months between various regions have different names based on the key feature of each month in their particular region. In the Eastern Ojibwe, this can be seen in when the sucker makes its run, which allows the Ojibwe to fish for them. Additionally, Rhodes also informs of not only the variability in the month names, but how in Eastern Ojibwe these names were originally applied to the lunar months the Ojibwe originally used, which was a lunisolar calendar, fixed by the date of Akiinaaniwan (typically December 27) that marks when sunrise is the latest in the Northern Hemisphere.

{| class="wikitable"
|- style="vertical-align:bottom;"
!RomanMonth
!Month inEastern Ojibwe
!Englishtranslation
!Original order in the Ojibwa year
!Starting at the first full moon after:
|-
|rowspan=2|Januaryin those places that have a sucker run during that time
|n[a]mebin-giizis
|rowspan=2|sucker moon
|rowspan=2|
|rowspan=2|Akiinaaniwan on December 27
|-
|n[a]meb[i]ni-giizis
|-
|February
|[o]naab[a]ni-giizis
|Crust-on-the-snow moon
|
|January 25
|-
|March
|zii[n]z[i]baak[wa]doke-giizis
|Sugaring moon
|
|February 26
|-
|rowspan=2|Aprilin those places that have a sucker run during that time
|n[a]mebin-giizis
|rowspan=2|sucker moon
|rowspan=4|
|rowspan=4|March 25
|-
|n[a]meb[i]ni-giizis
|-
|Aprilin those places that do not have a sucker run during that time
|rowspan=2|waawaas[a]gone-giizis
|rowspan=2|Flower moon
|-
|Mayin those places that have an April sucker run
|-
|Mayin those places that have a January sucker run
|rowspan=2|g[i]tige-giizis
|rowspan=2|Planting moon
|rowspan=2|
|rowspan=2|April 24
|-
|Junein those places that have an April sucker run
|-
|Junein those places that have a January sucker run
|[o]deh[i]min-giizis
|Strawberry moon
|
|May 23
|-
|July
|miin-giizis
|Blueberry moon
|
|June 22
|-
|August
|[o]dat[a]gaag[o]min-giizis
|Blackberry moon
|
|July 20
|-
|September
|m[an]daamin-giizis
|Corn moon
|
|August 18
|-
|rowspan=2|October
|b[i]naakwe-giizis
|Leaves-fall moon
|rowspan=2|
|rowspan=2|September 17
|-
|b[i]naakwii-giizis
|Harvest moon
|-
|November
|g[a]shkadin-giizis
|Freeze-up moon
|
|October 16
|-
|December
|g[i]chi-b[i]boon-giizis
|Big-winter moon
|
|November 15
|-
|Januaryin those places that do not have a sucker run during that time
|[o]shki-b[i]boon-gii[zi]soons
|Little new-winter moon
|
|
|}

See also 

 Maya calendar
 Chinese calendar
 Egyptian calendar
 Ethiopian calendar
 Lunar month
 Assyrian calendar
 Kurdish calendar
 Month of year

Footnotes

References 

 
Calendars
Orbit of the Moon
Orders of magnitude (time)
Units of time